Rarities is a compilation album by Indigo Girls. It was released in 2005. It contains studio, demo, and live tracks (both original and cover versions of songs), many of which had previously been released on other compilation and soundtrack albums.

The vocals on most of the songs are performed entirely by the Indigo Girls; two songs feature vocal contributions from Michael Stipe ("I'll Give You My Skin") and Ani DiFranco ("Ramblin' Round").

Track listing

Personnel
Indigo Girls
Amy Ray – lead vocals, guitars
Emily Saliers – lead vocals, guitars

Additional personnel
Ani DiFranco – lead vocals
Michael Stipe – backing vocals on "I'll Give You My Skin"

Charts

References

2005 compilation albums
Indigo Girls compilation albums
Epic Records compilation albums